Ernest Elmer Blandin (June 21, 1919 – September 16, 1968) was a professional American football tackle who played six seasons for the Cleveland Browns and Baltimore Colts in the National Football League (NFL) and All-America Football Conference (AAFC). Blandin was a standout as a tackle at Tulane University and earned All-America honors in 1941, his senior year. Blandin was drafted to play for the Philadelphia Eagles, but he instead joined the military and served in the Pacific theater of World War II. Upon his discharge, he signed with the Browns of the AAFC and played on the team for two seasons. The Browns won the league championship in both of those years. Blandin was then sent to the Colts, where he remained through the 1950 season. He played one more year of professional football in 1953.

College career

Blandin attended Tulane University and played for the Tulane Green Wave football team between 1939 and 1941. He was part of an offensive line that was one of the largest in the country at the time: the linemen averaged 214 pounds. Blandin was named a consensus All-American after the 1941 season.

Blandin was drafted by the Philadelphia Eagles in the 1942 NFL Draft, but he delayed a professional football career to join the U.S. Navy as America's involvement in World War II intensified. Blandin served in the Pacific theater, spending a year in the Marshall Islands and three months in Hawaii.

Professional career

After the war, Blandin signed with the Cleveland Browns in 1946 as the team geared up to play its first season in the All-America Football Conference. He rotated at left tackle with Chet Adams in 1946 and 1947. The Browns won the AAFC championship both of those years. By early 1948, the league was looking for ways to distribute talent more evenly across its teams, and several Browns players, including Blandin, were sent to the Baltimore Colts to help the struggling team. Paul Brown, Cleveland's coach, called Blandin "one of my best men" and insisted that the AAFC's commissioner, Admiral Jonas H. Ingram, tell Blandin that the move was Ingram's decision.

Blandin played at left tackle for the Colts until 1950, when the team ceased to exist. He left football before returning for one additional season in 1953 with a newly named Colts team that had played the previous season as the Dallas Texans.

Later life and death

Blandin was inducted into the Greater New Orleans Sports Hall of Fame in 1987. He is also a member of Tulane's sports hall of fame. He died in 1968.

References

Bibliography

External links

 Tulane profile of Blandin

1919 births
1968 deaths
American football tackles
Baltimore Colts players
Cleveland Browns (AAFC) players
Georgia Pre-Flight Skycrackers football players
Tulane Green Wave football players
United States Navy personnel of World War II
People from Augusta, Kansas
Players of American football from Kansas
Baltimore Colts (1947–1950) players